Inioteuthis maculosa is a species of bobtail squid native to the Indo-Pacific. It occurs in the northern Indian Ocean, Persian Gulf, Arabian Sea, Bay of Bengal, Andaman Sea, and off India, Taiwan, the Philippines, and Indonesia.

Females grow to 14 mm in mantle length, while males are not known to exceed 13 mm ML.

The type specimen was collected off the Andaman Islands and is deposited at the Zoological Survey of India in Kolkata.

References

External links

Bobtail squid
Molluscs described in 1896
Taxa named by Edwin Stephen Goodrich